"And She Would Darken the Memory" (sometimes referred to as "And She Would Darken the Memory of Youth") is a song by Scottish indie rock band The Twilight Sad, that appears on the EP The Twilight Sad, and their debut album, Fourteen Autumns & Fifteen Winters. The song was released as the album's second single on 16 July 2007 on Fat Cat Records. A music video was also produced for the song, directed by Mark Charlton. The track would appear in a re-worked version as the opening track to the mini-album Here, It Never Snowed. Afterwards It Did in June 2008.

"And She Would Darken the Memory" was also featured in the 2008 video game Saints Row 2.

Track listing

Credits
 James Alexander Graham – vocals
 Andy MacFarlane – guitar, accordion
 Craig Orzel – bass
 Mark Devine – drums
 Produced by The Twilight Sad
 Recorded by David Paterson
 Mixed by Peter Katis
 Additional production on "That Summer" remix by Olivier Alary
 Additional piano on "That Summer" remix by Johannes Malfatti
 Additional saxophone on "That Summer" remix by Erik Hove
 Mastered by Mandy Parnell
 dlt – artwork

References

External links
Single synopsis at Fat Cat Records

2007 singles
The Twilight Sad songs
2007 songs